Arkera also spelled as Arakera is a village in the Devadurga taluk of Raichur district in the Indian state of Karnataka. It is located in the Devadurga taluk of Raichur district in Karnataka.

Demographics
 India census, Arkera had a population of 5038 with 2630 males and 2408 females.

See also
 Raichur
 Districts of Karnataka

References

External links
 http://Raichur.nic.in/

Villages in Raichur district